The Yuwaalaraay,  also spelt Euahlayi, Euayelai,  Eualeyai, Ualarai, Yuwaaliyaay and Yuwallarai, are an Aboriginal Australian people of north-western New South Wales.

Name and language

The ethnonym  derives from their word for "no" to which a form of the comitative suffix, is attached.

While AUSTLANG cites Euahlayi, Ualarai, Euhahlayi, and Juwalarai as synonyms for  the Gamilaraay language in earlier sources, more recent sources suggest different distinctions. Yuwaalaraay is one of six dialects or languages of Gamilaraay.

According to Robert M. W. Dixon, Ualarai is a Wiradhuric tongue, a dialect (Yuwaalaraay) of Gamilaraay. The Yuwaalaraay distinguished various kinds of Gamilaraay, telling K. Langloh Parker:

Country
The Yuwaalaraay traditional lands stretch over an estimated . It is on the Narran River and from the Narran Wetlands through to Angledool near the Queensland border. It takes in Walgett to the southeast.  Running southwest, it extends from the Birrie and Bokhara rivers to Brewarrina. The western frontier lies between the Culgoa and Birrie rivers.

Yuwaalaraay country is rather dry even over winter, which permitted a longer gathering and conservation of seeds as a food resource.

Social organisation
The Yuwaalaraay are organised in terms of matrilineal descent.

Economy
They were proto-agriculturalists, who used the grasslands of their area, harvesting foods for storage, a practice (called generically  or 'dung food') also found among several other tribes such as the Iliaura and Watjarri. The surplus was stored ('storage') in caves, enabling women to free up their time, since the existence of reserves relieved them of the need to gather in edible foodstuffs every day.

Women and men worked at the harvest. The women would cull the grass heads with their ears, still green, so they could be stacked within a brushwood enclosure that was then set alight. The seeds were winnowed by stirring through the heap with long sticks, and gathered on opossum skins. Then the men took over as threshers, separating the husks by alternately beating and then stamping the seeds laid in two holes, on rectangular the other circular. The resulting seedstock was then packed in skin bags, Once taken out of storage, the seeds were prepared by grinding then, with additions of water, on  millstones and cooking the cakes over ashes. Milling was also done with a nether millstone, a word that also meant the milled seed itself.
Coolibah eucalypts yielded branches that were piled on hard ground and left to dry until they yielded up their seed which was then milled.

Mythology 

Reports on Aboriginal belief systems often drove controversies over whether Aboriginal Australians understood the nature of conception or whether they recognised a supreme deity, one of the criteria for the kind of civilisation Western colonialism promoted. Andrew Lang asked Mrs Parker what the Yuwaalaraay view was in regard to this. On his departure he distributed his totem attributes to all, which they would take from their mother, so that marriage was interdicted for people with the same mother (totem). He dwelt in his sky camp with his son . He had an earthly subordinate  who was a ceremonial overseer to the mysteries of tribal initiation.

William Ridley prevailed upon an elder named  (Dinoun) of the  tribe, known among whites as King Rory, to recount his tribe's legends concerning the firmament. The conversation place on the evening of 10 July at Gingi.  has been identified as likely an elder of the Yuwaalaraay.

Alternative names
According to Tindale:
  tribe
  (station name over the river from Walgett)

Some words 
 , ("wise folk", namely, any male or female gifted with spiritual power.)
 , ("no").

Some modern terms shared with Gamilaraay speakers:
  (sheep, perhaps from jumbuck)
  (white man, borrowed from a Wangaaybuwan adjective meaning 'ugly-looking', referring also to a creature, the devil devil)

Notes

Citations

Sources

Further reading

 
 

Aboriginal peoples of New South Wales